Antigua and Barbuda is a sovereign island country in the West Indies. It lies at the juncture of the Caribbean Sea and the Atlantic Ocean in the Leeward Islands part of the Lesser Antilles, at 17°N latitude. 

The permanent population is approximately 97,120 ( est.), with 97% residing in Antigua. St. John's, Antigua, is the country's capital, major city, and largest port. Codrington is Barbuda's largest town.

In 1493, Christopher Columbus reconnoitered the island of Antigua, which he named for the Church of Santa María La Antigua. Great Britain colonized Antigua in 1632 and Barbuda in 1678. A part of the Federal Colony of the Leeward Islands from 1871, Antigua and Barbuda joined the West Indies Federation in 1958. With the breakup of the federation in 1962, it became one of the West Indies Associated States in 1967. Following a period of internal self-governance, it gained full independence from the United Kingdom on 1 November 1981. Antigua and Barbuda is a member of the Commonwealth and a Commonwealth realm; it is a constitutional monarchy with Charles III as its head of state.

The economy of Antigua and Barbuda is largely dependent on tourism, which accounts for 80% of its GDP. Like other island nations, Antigua and Barbuda is vulnerable to the effects of climate change, such as sea level rise, and increased intensity of extreme weather like hurricanes. These cause coastal erosion, water scarcity, and other challenges.

Antigua and Barbuda offers a citizenship by investment program. The country levies no personal income tax.

Etymology 
The island of Antigua was originally called  by the Arawaks and is locally known by that name today; the Caribs possibly called Barbuda . Christopher Columbus, while sailing by in 1493, may have named it , after an icon in the Spanish Seville Cathedral. The "bearded" of Barbuda is thought to refer either to the male inhabitants of the island, or the bearded fig trees present there.

History

Pre-colonial period
Antigua was first settled by archaic age hunter-gatherer Amerindians called the Ciboney. Carbon dating has established the earliest settlements started around 3100 BC. They were succeeded by the ceramic age pre-Columbian Arawak-speaking Saladoid people who migrated from the lower Orinoco River. They introduced agriculture, raising, among other crops, the famous Antigua black pineapple (Ananas comosus), corn, sweet potatoes, chiles, guava, tobacco, and cotton. Later on the more bellicose Caribs also settled the island, possibly by force.

European arrival and settlement
Christopher Columbus was the first European to sight the islands in 1493. The Spanish did not colonise Antigua until after a combination of European and African diseases, malnutrition, and slavery eventually extirpated most of the native population; smallpox was probably the greatest killer.

The English settled on Antigua in 1632; Christopher Codrington settled on Barbuda in 1685. Tobacco and then sugar was grown, worked by a large population of slaves transported from West Africa, who soon came to vastly outnumber the European settlers.

Colonial era
The English maintained control of the islands, repulsing an attempted French attack in 1666. The brutal conditions endured by the slaves led to revolts in 1701 and 1729 and a planned revolt in 1736, the last led by Prince Klaas, though it was discovered before it began and the ringleaders were executed. Slavery was abolished in the British Empire in 1833, affecting the economy. This was exacerbated by natural disasters such as the 1843 earthquake and the 1847 hurricane. Mining occurred on the isle of Redonda, however, this ceased in 1929 and the island has since remained uninhabited.

Part of the Leeward Islands colony, Antigua and Barbuda became part of the short-lived West Indies Federation from 1958 to 1962. Antigua and Barbuda subsequently became an associated state of the United Kingdom with full internal autonomy on 27 February 1967. The 1970s were dominated by discussions as to the islands' future and the rivalry between Vere Bird of the Antigua and Barbuda Labour Party (ABLP) (Premier from 1967 to 1971 and 1976 to 1981) and the Progressive Labour Movement (PLM) of George Walter (Premier 1971–1976). Eventually, Antigua and Barbuda gained full independence on 1 November 1981; Vere Bird became prime minister of the new country. The country opted to remain within the Commonwealth, retaining Queen Elizabeth as head of state, with the last governor, Sir Wilfred Jacobs, as governor-general.

Independence era
The first two decades of Antigua's independence were dominated politically by the Bird family and the ABLP, with Vere Bird ruling from 1981 to 1994, followed by his son Lester Bird from 1994 to 2004. Though providing a degree of political stability, and boosting tourism to the country, the Bird governments were frequently accused of corruption, cronyism and financial malfeasance. Vere Bird Jr., the elder son, was forced to leave the cabinet in 1990 following a scandal in which he was accused of smuggling Israeli weapons to Colombian drug-traffickers. Another son, Ivor Bird, was convicted of selling cocaine in 1995.

In 1995, Hurricane Luis caused severe damage on Barbuda.

The ABLP's dominance of Antiguan politics ended with the 2004 Antiguan general election, which was won by Winston Baldwin Spencer's United Progressive Party (UPP). Winston Baldwin Spencer was Prime Minister of Antigua and Barbuda from 2004 to 2014. However the UPP lost the 2014 Antiguan general election, with the ABLP returning to power under Gaston Browne. ABLP won 15 of the 17 seats in the 2018 snap election under the leadership of incumbent Prime Minister Gaston Browne.

In 2016, Nelson's Dockyard was designated as a UNESCO World Heritage Site.

Most of Barbuda was devastated in early September 2017 by Hurricane Irma, which brought winds with speeds reaching 295 km/h (185 mph). The storm damaged or destroyed 95% of the island's buildings and infrastructure, leaving Barbuda "barely habitable" according to Prime Minister Gaston Browne. Nearly everyone on the island was evacuated to Antigua.
Amidst the following rebuilding efforts on Barbuda that were estimated to cost at least $100 million, the government announced plans to revoke a century-old law of communal land ownership by allowing residents to buy land; a move that has been criticised as promoting "disaster capitalism".

Geography

Antigua and Barbuda both are generally low-lying islands whose terrain has been influenced more by limestone formations than volcanic activity. The highest point on Antigua and Barbuda is Boggy Peak, (known as Mt Obama 2008–2016)  located in southwestern Antigua, which is the remnant of a volcanic crater rising .

The shorelines of both islands are greatly indented with beaches, lagoons, and natural harbours. The islands are rimmed by reefs and shoals. There are few streams as rainfall is slight. Both islands lack adequate amounts of fresh groundwater.

Cities and villages 

The most populous cities in Antigua and Barbuda are mostly on Antigua, being Saint John's, All Saints, Piggotts, and Liberta. The most populous city on Barbuda is Codrington. It is estimated that 25% of the population lives in an urban area, which is much lower than the international average of 55%.

Islands

Antigua and Barbuda consists mostly of its two namesake islands, Antigua, and Barbuda. Other than that, Antigua and Barbuda's biggest islands are Guiana Island and Long Island off the coast of Antigua, and Redonda island, which is far from both of the main islands.

Climate 
In general the wettest period is between September and November. The islands generally experience low humidity and recurrent droughts. The coolest period is between December and February.

Hurricanes strike on an average of once a year, including the powerful Category 5 Hurricane Irma, on 6 September 2017, which damaged 95% of the structures on Barbuda. Some 1,800 people were evacuated to Antigua.

An estimate published by Time indicated that over $100 million would be required to rebuild homes and infrastructure. Philmore Mullin, Director of Barbuda's National Office of Disaster Services, said that "all critical infrastructure and utilities are non-existent – food supply, medicine, shelter, electricity, water, communications, waste management". He summarised the situation as follows: "Public utilities need to be rebuilt in their entirety... It is optimistic to think anything can be rebuilt in six months ... In my 25 years in disaster management, I have never seen something like this."

Environmental issues

Demographics

Ethnic groups
The ethnic distribution consists of 91% Black, 4.4% mixed race, 1.7% White, and 2.9% other (primarily East Indian). Most Whites are of British descent. Christian Levantine Arabs and a small number of East Asians and Sephardic Jews make up the remainder of the population.

An increasingly large percentage of the population lives abroad, most notably in the United Kingdom (Antiguan Britons), the United States and Canada. A minority of Antiguan residents are immigrants from other countries, particularly from Dominica, Guyana and Jamaica, and, increasingly, from the Dominican Republic, St. Vincent and the Grenadines and Nigeria. An estimated 4,500 American citizens also make their home in Antigua and Barbuda, making their numbers one of the largest American populations in the English-speaking Eastern Caribbean. 68.47% of the population was born in Antigua and Barbuda.

Languages
English is the working language. The Barbudan accent is slightly different from the Antiguan.

In the years before Antigua and Barbuda's independence, Standard English was widely spoken in preference to Antiguan Creole. Generally, the upper and middle classes shun Antiguan Creole. The educational system dissuades the use of Antiguan Creole and instruction is done in Standard (British) English.

Many of the words used in the Antiguan dialect are derived from British as well as African languages. This can be easily seen in phrases such as: "Innit?" meaning "Isn’t it?". Common island proverbs can often be traced to Africa eg.pidgin.

Spanish is spoken by around 10,000 inhabitants.

Religion

A majority (77%) of Antiguans are Christians, with the Anglicans (17.6%) being the largest single denomination. Other Christian denominations present are Seventh-day Adventist Church (12.4%), Pentecostalism (12.2%), Moravian Church (8.3%), Roman Catholics
(8.2%), Methodist Church (5.6%), Wesleyan Holiness Church (4.5%), Church of God (4.1%), Baptists (3.6%), Mormonism (<1.0%), as well as Jehovah's Witnesses.

Governance

Political system

The politics of Antigua and Barbuda take place within a framework of a unitary, parliamentary, representative democratic monarchy, in which the head of state is the monarch who appoints the governor-general as vice-regal representative. Charles III is the present King of Antigua and Barbuda, having served in that position since the death of his mother, Elizabeth II. She had been the queen since the islands' independence from the United Kingdom in 1981. The King is currently represented by Governor-General Sir Rodney Williams. A council of ministers is appointed by the governor-general on the advice of the prime minister, currently Gaston Browne (2014–). The prime minister is the head of government.

Executive power is exercised by the government while legislative power is vested in both the government and the two chambers of Parliament. The bicameral Parliament consists of the Senate (17 members appointed by members of the government and the opposition party, and approved by the governor-general), and the House of Representatives (17 members elected by first past the post) to serve five-year terms.

The current Leader of His Majesty's Loyal Opposition is the United Progressive Party Member of Parliament (MP), the Honourable Baldwin Spencer.

Elections

The last election was held on 21 March 2018. The Antigua Barbuda Labour Party (ABLP) led by Prime Minister Gaston Browne won 15 of the 17 seats in the House of Representatives. The previous election was on 12 June 2014, during which the Antigua Labour Party won 14 seats, and the United Progressive Party 3 seats.

Since 1951, elections have been won by the populist Antigua Labour Party. However, in the Antigua and Barbuda legislative election of 2004 saw the defeat of the longest-serving elected government in the Caribbean.

Vere Bird was prime minister from 1981 to 1994 and chief minister of Antigua from 1960 to 1981, except for the 1971–1976 period when the Progressive Labour Movement (PLM) defeated his party. Bird, the nation's first prime minister, is credited with having brought Antigua and Barbuda and the Caribbean into a new era of independence. Prime Minister Lester Bryant Bird succeeded the elder Bird in 1994.

Party elections
Gaston Browne defeated his predecessor Lester Bryant Bird at the Antigua Labour Party's biennial convention in November 2012 held to elect a political leader and other officers. The party then altered its name from the Antigua Labour Party (ALP) to the Antigua and Barbuda Labour Party (ABLP). This was done to officially include the party's presence on the sister island of Barbuda in its organisation, the only political party on the mainland to have a physical branch in Barbuda.

Judiciary 
The judicial branch is the Eastern Caribbean Supreme Court (based in Saint Lucia; one judge of the Supreme Court is a resident of the islands and presides over the High Court of Justice). Antigua is also a member of the Caribbean Court of Justice. The Judicial Committee of the Privy Council serves as its Supreme Court of Appeal.

Foreign relations

Antigua and Barbuda is a member of the United Nations, the Bolivarian Alliance for the Americas, the Commonwealth of Nations, the Caribbean Community, the Organization of Eastern Caribbean States, the Organization of American States, the World Trade Organization and the Eastern Caribbean's Regional Security System.

Antigua and Barbuda is also a member of the International Criminal Court (with a Bilateral Immunity Agreement of Protection for the US military as covered under Article 98 of the Rome Statute).

In 2013, Antigua and Barbuda called for reparations for slavery at the United Nations. Prime Minister Baldwin Spencer said "We have recently seen a number of leaders apologising", and that they should now "match their words with concrete and material benefits."

Military

The Antigua and Barbuda Defence Force has around 260 members dispersed between the line infantry regiment, service and support unit and coast guard. There is also the Antigua and Barbuda Cadet Corps made up of 200 teenagers between the ages of 12 to 18.

In 2018, Antigua and Barbuda signed the UN treaty on the Prohibition of Nuclear Weapons.

Administrative divisions

Antigua and Barbuda is divided into six parishes and two dependencies:

Note: Though Barbuda and Redonda are called dependencies they are integral parts of the state, making them essentially administrative divisions. Dependency is simply a title.

Human rights
Antigua and Barbuda does not allow discrimination in employment and there are laws against domestic abuse and child abuse. Same-sex sexual activity is legal in Antigua and Barbuda since July, 2022.

Economy

Tourism dominates the economy, accounting for more than half of the gross domestic product (GDP). Antigua is famous for its many luxury resorts as an ultra-high-end travel destination. Weakened tourist activity in the lower and middle market segments since early 2000 has slowed the economy, however, and squeezed the government into a tight fiscal corner. Antigua and Barbuda has enacted policies to attract high-net-worth citizens and residents, such as enacting a 0% personal income tax rate in 2019.

Investment banking and financial services also make up an important part of the economy. Major world banks with offices in Antigua include the Royal Bank of Canada (RBC) and Scotiabank. Financial-services corporations with offices in Antigua include PriceWaterhouseCoopers, Pannell Kerr Forster, and KPMG. The US Securities and Exchange Commission has accused the Antigua-based Stanford International Bank, owned by Texas billionaire Allen Stanford, of orchestrating a huge fraud which may have bilked investors of some $8 billion.

The twin-island nation's agricultural production is focused on its domestic market and constrained by a limited water supply and a labour shortage stemming from the lure of higher wages in tourism and construction work.

Manufacturing comprises 2% of GDP and is made up of enclave-type assembly for export, the major products being bedding, handicrafts, and electronic components. Prospects for economic growth in the medium term will continue to depend on income growth in the industrialised world, especially in the United States, from which about one-third to one-half of all tourists come.

Access to biocapacity is lower than world average. In 2016, Antigua and Barbuda had 0.8 global hectares of biocapacity per person within its territory, much less than the world average of 1.6 global hectares per person. In 2016, Antigua and Barbuda used 4.3 global hectares of biocapacity per person – their ecological footprint of consumption. This means they use more biocapacity than Antigua and Barbuda contains. As a result, Antigua and Barbuda are running a biocapacity deficit.

Antigua and Barbuda also uses an economic citizenship program to spur investment into the country.

Transport

Education

Culture
The culture is predominantly a mixture of West African and British cultural influences.

Cricket is the national sport. Other popular sports include football, boat racing and surfing. (Antigua Sailing Week attracts locals and visitors from all over the world).

Music

Festivals
The national Carnival held each August commemorates the abolition of slavery in the British West Indies, although on some islands, Carnival may celebrate the coming of Lent. Its festive pageants, shows, contests and other activities are a major tourist attraction.

Cuisine

Media

There are three newspapers: the Antigua Daily Observer, Antigua New Room and The Antiguan Times.  The Antigua Observer is the only daily printed newspaper.

The local television channel ABS TV 10 is available (it is the only station that shows exclusively local programs). There are also several local and regional radio stations, such as V2C-AM 620, ZDK-AM 1100, VYBZ-FM 92.9, ZDK-FM 97.1, Observer Radio 91.1 FM, DNECA Radio 90.1 FM, Second Advent Radio 101.5 FM, Abundant Life Radio 103.9 FM, Crusader Radio 107.3 FM, Nice FM 104.3, Pointe FM 99.1, WTP 93.5FM.

Sports

Cricket is the most popular sport in the islands. And with Sir Isaac Vivian Alexander Richards  who represented the West Indies cricket team between 1974 and 1991, Antigua had one of the worlds' most famous batsmen ever. The Antigua and Barbuda national cricket team represented the country at the 1998 Commonwealth Games, but Antiguan cricketers otherwise play for the Leeward Islands cricket team in domestic matches and the West Indies cricket team internationally. The 2007 Cricket World Cup was hosted in the West Indies from 11 March to 28 April 2007. Antigua hosted eight matches at the Sir Vivian Richards Stadium, which was completed on 11 February 2007 and can hold up to 20,000 people.
Antigua is a Host of Stanford Twenty20 – Twenty20 Cricket, a version started by Allen Stanford in 2006 as a regional cricket game with almost all Caribbean islands taking part. From 15 January to 5 February 2022 the Sir Vivian Richards Stadium was one of the venues for the 2022 ICC Under-19 Cricket World Cup.Rugby and Netball are popular as well.

Association football, or soccer, is also a very popular sport. Antigua has a national football team which entered World Cup qualification for the 1974 tournament and for 1986 and beyond. A professional team was formed in 2011, Antigua Barracuda FC, which played in the USL Pro, a lower professional league in the USA. The nation's team had a major achievement in 2012, getting out of its preliminary group for the 2014 World Cup, notably due to a victory over powerful Haiti. In its first game in the next CONCACAF group play on 8 June 2012 in Tampa, FL, Antigua and Barbuda, comprising 17 Barracuda players and 7 from the lower English professional leagues, scored a goal against the United States. However, the team lost 3:1 to the US.

Daniel Bailey had become the first Antiguan to reach a world indoor final, where he won a bronze medal at the 2010 IAAF World Indoor Championships. He was also the first Antiguan to make a 100m final at the 2009 World Championships in Athletics, and the first Antiguan to run under 10 seconds over 100m.

Brendan Christian won a gold medal in the 200m and bronze medal in the 100m at the 2007 Pan American Games. James Grayman won a bronze medal at the same games in the men's High Jump.

Miguel Francis is the first Antiguan to run sub 20 seconds in the 200m.

Heather Samuel won a bronze medal at the 1995 Pan American Games over 100m.

400m Hurdles Olympian Gold Medalist Rai Benjamin previously represented Antigua and Barbuda before representing the United States. His Silver medal run at the 2020 Olympic Games made him the second-fastest person in history over 400m Hurdles with a time of 46.17.

Notable people

Symbols 
The national bird is the frigate bird, and the national tree is the Bucida buceras (Whitewood tree).

Clare Waight Keller included agave karatto to represent Antigua and Barbuda in Meghan Markle's wedding veil, which included the distinctive flora of each Commonwealth country.

Despite being an introduced species, the European fallow deer (Dama dama) is the national animal.

In 1992, the government ran a national competition to design a new national dress for the country; this was won by artist Heather Doram.

See also

 Geology of Antigua and Barbuda
 Outline of Antigua and Barbuda
 Index of Antigua and Barbuda–related articles
 Transport in Antigua and Barbuda

References

Works cited

Further reading
 Nicholson, Desmond V., Antigua, Barbuda, and Redonda: A Historical Sketch, St. Johns, Antigua: Antigua and Barbuda Museum, 1991.
 Dyde, Brian, A History of Antigua: The Unsuspected Isle, London: Macmillan Caribbean, 2000.
 Gaspar, David Barry – Bondmen & Rebels: A Study of Master-Slave Relations in Antigua, with Implications for Colonial America.
 Harris, David R. – Plants, Animals, and Man in the Outer Leeward Islands, West Indies. An Ecological Study of Antigua, Barbuda, and Anguilla.
 Henry, Paget – Peripheral Capitalism and Underdevelopment in Antigua.
 Lazarus-Black, Mindie – Legitimate Acts and Illegal Encounters: Law and Society in Antigua and Barbuda.
 Riley, J. H. – Catalogue of a Collection of Birds from Barbuda and Antigua, British West Indies.
 Rouse, Irving and Birgit Faber Morse – Excavations at the Indian Creek Site, Antigua, West Indies.
 Thomas Hearne. Southampton.

External links

 
 
 Antigua and Barbuda, United States Library of Congress
 Antigua and Barbuda. The World Factbook. Central Intelligence Agency.
 Antigua and Barbuda from UCB Libraries GovPubs
 
 Antigua and Barbuda from the BBC News
 World Bank's country data profile for Antigua and Barbuda
 ArchaeologyAntigua.org – 2010March13 source of archaeological information for Antigua and Barbuda
 Antigua & Barbuda Official Business Hub

 
Countries in the Caribbean
Island countries
Commonwealth realms
Countries in North America
English-speaking countries and territories
Member states of the Caribbean Community
Member states of the Commonwealth of Nations
Member states of the Organisation of Eastern Caribbean States
Member states of the United Nations
Small Island Developing States
British Leeward Islands
Former British colonies and protectorates in the Americas
Former colonies in North America
1630s establishments in the Caribbean
1632 establishments in the British Empire
1981 disestablishments in the United Kingdom
States and territories established in 1981